"Flux" is a song by English singer Ellie Goulding, released on 1 March 2019. The song was written by Goulding, Jim Eliot and Joe Kearns. It was included on Goulding's fourth studio album, Brightest Blue (2020).

Background
In an interview with The Guardian on New Year's Day 2019, Goulding announced that her fourth album would be released in 2019. She also talked about three songs named "Flux", "Love I'm Given" and "Electricity". According to her, "Flux" is "about the person who you almost ended up with". On 21 February, she took to social media to announce the single by posting its cover art and the release date of the track. The following week she shared further details regarding the song, including lyrics and a still from the music video.

Composition
"Flux" is written in the key of C major and has a tempo of 93 beats per minute in common time.

Music video
Goulding posted a silent teaser of the music video hours prior to its release. The accompanying music video premiered on YouTube on 1 March 2019, alongside the song's official release on all platforms. Shot entirely in black and white, the video depicts Goulding inside a dark hall playing a piano as rain pours on her. The video ends as a soaked Goulding stares gloomily at the camera as the rain continues.

Track listing

Personnel
Credits adapted from Tidal.

 Ellie Goulding – lead vocals, songwriting, associated performer
 Joe Kearns – songwriting, production, engineering, programming, bass guitar, associated performer
 Jim Eliot – songwriting, piano, associated performer
 Maxwell Cooke – production, associated performer, string arranger
 Joe Clegg – associated performer, percussion
 Mark Knight – assistant recording engineer, studio personnel
 Rowan McIntosh – assistant recording engineer, studio personnel
 Hilary Skewes – strings contractor
 Jason Elliott – engineer, studio personnel
 Matt Colton – mastering, studio personnel
 Jamie Snell – mixing, studio personnel
 Sam Thompson - conductor

Charts

Release history

References

2019 singles
2019 songs
Ellie Goulding songs
Songs written by Ellie Goulding
Songs written by Jim Eliot
Songs written by Joe Kearns